Ilinga was an Australian car manufacturer founded in Melbourne by Tony Farrell and his partner, Daryl Davies, in business from 1974 to 1975. The company's only model, the AF-2, saw only two examples produced, despite having fifteen customers order one. Presented at the 1975 Melbourne Motor Show, the AF-2 was a potential luxury sports car, built to compete with the likes of Porsche and Aston Martin. The 1973 oil crisis and high price tag chased many potential customers away, as well as Australia's lack of automotive history. It was powered by a Leyland P76 engine modified to 220 horsepower. This engine was sourced from Rover. Plans for a four-door model in 1974 were scrapped before the factory was abandoned with broken Borg-Warner gearboxes littering the floor, as the transmission manufacturer refused to provide further assistance.  US $328,000 was spent before the company finally folded after just a year in business. The two AF-2 models constructed featured a digital clock, a delay switch which extinguished the lights and locked the doors if the driver didn't do so, a self-seeking cassette player with radio, electric windows, and a fully integrated air conditioning unit. One AF-2 resides in Museum Victoria, in Melbourne. The other was reportedly used as a daily driver by a fast food restaurant owner and re-painted green (the original color of both units was a very light powder blue). It awaits restoration.

The word "ilinga" is an Australian Aboriginal term for 'over the horizon'.

See also

 List of automobile manufacturers
 List of car brands

References

External links

Car manufacturers of Australia